Gennaro Nunziante is an Italian film director. He directed the three highest-grossing Italian films in Italy headed by Quo Vado?.

Career
He teamed up with Checco Zalone to write Cado dalle nubi (2009), with Zalone starring and Nunziante directing.

They followed it up in 2011 with Che bella giornata. It opened with a record Italian opening weekend of $9.4 million and became the highest-grossing Italian film of all-time in Italy, grossing €43.4 million, surpassing Roberto Benigni's Life Is Beautiful. Life Is Beautiful retained the worldwide grossing record for an Italian film with $70 million worldwide.

In 2013, he and Zalone followed it up with Sole a catinelle which surpassed it with an opening record of €19.2 million and a total Italian gross of €51.9 million.

In January 2016, his and Zalone's next film Quo Vado? set another opening weekend record grossing over €22m over the three-day holiday weekend and went on to become the highest-grossing Italian film of all-time with €65.3 million, second only to Avatar in Italy with €65.7 million.

His and Zalone's films are currently the second, third and fifth highest-grossing films in Italy.

Filmography
Cado dalle nubi (2009)
What a Beautiful Day (2011)
Sole a catinelle (2013)
Quo Vado? (2016)
Il vegetale (2018)
Belli ciao (2022)

References

External links

Living people
Italian film directors
Year of birth missing (living people)